Don't Ask is the third studio album by Australian singer Tina Arena released by Columbia Records in Australia on 14 November 1994.

Overview
Arena co-wrote all of the songs on the original release of the album which was produced by David Tyson. The album spawned six successful singles "Chains", "Sorrento Moon (I Remember)", "Heaven Help My Heart", "Wasn't It Good", "That's the Way a Woman Feels" and the cover version of Maria McKee's song "Show Me Heaven" which was recorded for the international version and was not released as a single in Australia.

Don't Ask and its singles earned Arena ten ARIA Awards nominations throughout 1995 and 1996, winning five, including Album of the Year. It is the first album by a female artist to do so.

Track listing

Personnel
Tina Arena − vocals, background vocals
Peter Asher − percussion
Erika Duke-Kirkpatrick − cello
Claude Gaudette − piano
Raven Kane − background vocals
Peter Kent − violin
Kirkpatrick − cello
Matt Lang − percussion
Bob Mann − guitar
Marilyn Martin − background vocals
Pat Mastelotto − percussion, drums
Robert Parde − background vocals
John Pierce − bass guitar
Tim Pierce − acoustic guitar, guitar
Rick Price − acoustic guitar, background vocals
David Tyson − keyboard, Hammond organ, background vocals
Carlos Vega − drums
The Water Family − background vocals
Jai Winding − piano, keyboard

Production
Producers: Peter Asher, Chris O'Brien, David Tyson
Engineers: Greg Droman, George Massenburg, Frank Wolf
Mixing: Chris Lord-Alge
Mixing assistant: Steve Gallagher
Mastering: Doug Sax
Production coordination: Tony DeFranco
Programming: Chris O'Brien, Dave Tyson
Arrangers: Tina Arena, David Campbell, Robert Parde, David Tyson

Charts
Don't Ask became Arena's highest selling album to date selling in excess of 2 million copies worldwide and was certified ten times platinum by the ARIA.

Weekly charts

Year-end charts

Certifications

Release history

See also
List of best-selling albums in Australia

References

1994 albums
ARIA Award-winning albums
Columbia Records albums
Tina Arena albums